Achille René-Boisneuf (Le Gosier, 9 November 1873 - Pointe-à-Pitre 29 December 1927) was a French politician and one of the first black deputies in the French National Assembly. He is incorrectly given the name Émile instead of Achille in Jean Joly's Dictionnaire des parlementaires français de 1889 à 1940 1946.

Achille was born son of Hyacinthe Boisneuf, a well to do freed slave, and a farm worker, Amanda Mathurine René, then adopted by Boisneuf and his wife and put through school. Achille René-Boisneuf was mayor of Pointe-à-Pitre 1911–1922, President of the Conseil Général of Guadeloupe 1912–1922, then one of Guadeloupe's deputies in Paris 1914–1924.

The rue Achille René-Boisneuf in Pointe-à-Pitre is named after him.

References

1873 births
1927 deaths
People from Le Gosier
Guadeloupean politicians
Radical Party (France) politicians
Members of the 11th Chamber of Deputies of the French Third Republic
Members of the 12th Chamber of Deputies of the French Third Republic
Mayors of places in Guadeloupe
Black French politicians